Pintendre Aerodrome  is located adjacent to Pintendre, Quebec, Canada.

References

Registered aerodromes in Chaudière-Appalaches